Fraser Alexander (born 20 February 2003) is an English professional footballer who plays as a midfielder for  club Ipswich Town.

Career
Alexander joined the Academy at Ipswich Town at the age of eight and went on to captain the under-18 side. He was named in "The 11" by the League Football Education in November 2020 after completing the BTEC Extended Diploma to a D*D*D* standard and making excellent progress in his mathematics A-Level. He signed his first professional contract  after being named as U18 Second Year Player of the Year in 2021. He made his first-team debut on 30 August 2022, coming on as an 81st-minute substitute for Cameron Humphreys in 6–0 win over Northampton Town in an EFL Trophy match at Portman Road. On 21 October 2022, he joined Cheshunt of the National League South on a one-month loan.

Style of play
Alexander describes himself as a "solid central midfielder".

Career statistics

References

2003 births
Living people
English footballers
Association football midfielders
Ipswich Town F.C. players
Cheshunt F.C. players
English Football League players
National League (English football) players